Parks and Recreation is an American situation comedy created by Greg Daniels and Michael Schur. The show premiered on NBC on April 9, 2009 and concluded on February 24, 2015 after airing seven seasons. The series stars Amy Poehler as Leslie Knope, an ambitious, mid-level bureaucrat working in the Parks and Recreation Department of Pawnee, a fictional town in Indiana. The sitcom features an ensemble cast, including Rashida Jones, Aziz Ansari, Nick Offerman, Aubrey Plaza, Chris Pratt, Adam Scott, Rob Lowe, Paul Schneider, Jim O'Heir and Retta, among others.

The show was nominated for a variety of different awards throughout its run, including sixteen Primetime Emmy Award nominations, twice as a comedy series and twice for writing. Parks and Recreation was also nominated for fifteen Critics' Choice Television Awards (three wins), two Art Directors Guild Awards, four Golden Globe Awards (one win), a Peabody Award (one win), a Producers Guild of America Award, five Satellite Awards, and five Writers Guild of America Awards, among other awards.

Poehler received the most recognition with 25 nominations for acting, winning an American Comedy Award, a Critics' Choice Television Award, a Golden Globe Award, a Gracie Award, as well as receiving six consecutive nominations for the Primetime Emmy Award for Outstanding Lead Actress in a Comedy Series, without any wins. Plaza has seven nominations, while Scott, Ansari, Offerman, and Jones each received two nominations for acting. Throughout its run, Parks and Recreation  won 13 awards from a total of 76 nominations.

Awards and nominations

ADG Awards 

The ADG Excellence in Production Design Award is presented each year by the American Art Directors Guild to recognize the best production design and art direction in the film and television industries. Parks and Recreation was nominated twice.

AFI Awards 

The AFI Award, created in 2000 by the American Film Institute, is given annually to ten films and ten television programs to acknowledge the "most significant achievements in the art of the moving image". Parks and Recreation was honored in 2011.

ALMA Awards 

The American Latino Media Arts Award, or simply ALMA Award, is an accolade presented annually to acknowledge the best American Latino contributions to film, music, and television. Plaza received two nominations.

American Comedy Awards 

The American Comedy Awards recognize the best work in comedy. The accolade is given to television programs, films or individuals. Parks and Recreation has two wins from four nominations.

Cinema Audio Society Awards 

The Cinema Audio Society Awards honor the outstanding achievements in audio mixing. Parks and Recreation has three consecutive nominations.

Critics' Choice Television Awards 

The Critics' Choice Television Award is an annual accolade given by the Broadcast Film Critics Association since 2011 in order to recognize the most significant achievements in television. Parks and Recreation has three wins out of fifteen nominations.

Emmy Awards 

The Emmy Awards were established in 1949 in order to recognize excellence in the American television industry, and are bestowed by members of the Academy of Television Arts & Sciences. Emmy Awards are given in different ceremonies presented annually; Primetime Emmy Awards recognize outstanding work in American primetime television programming, while the Creative Arts Emmy Awards are presented to honor technical and creative achievements, and include categories recognising work of art directors, lighting and costume designers, cinematographers, casting directors, and other production-based personnel. Parks and Recreation has sixteen nominations without any wins. Poehler was nominated for the best actress six times in a row for playing Leslie Knope with an additional nomination in 2012 for writing. Michael Schur has a nomination for writing in the same year as well. Parks and Recreation has two nominations for the best comedy series. The show has four further nominations for its sound mixing and a nomination for a short-format program for NBC.com series entitled Parks and Rec in Europe.

Primetime Emmy Awards

Primetime Creative Arts Emmy Awards

GLAAD Media Awards 

The GLAAD Media Award, established in 1990 by the American Gay & Lesbian Alliance Against Defamation, is given in order to "recognize and honor media for their fair, accurate and inclusive representations of the LGBT community and the issues that affect their lives." Parks and Recreation won once.

Golden Globe Awards 

The Golden Globe Award, founded in 1943, recognizes the best work in both film and television. The accolade is given by the members of the Hollywood Foreign Press Association (HFPA). Parks and Recreation received four nominations with Poehler winning once in 2014.

Golden Reel Awards 
The Golden Reel Award is presented by the Motion Picture Sound Editors to recognize achievements in sound editing for feature films, television, animation, and other categories. Parks and Recreation received one nomination.

Gracie Awards 

The Gracie Award was established in 1975 by the Alliance for Women in Media to recognize the best representation of women in the media. The award is given to various types of programming or individuals. Parks and Recreation has two wins.

Imagen Awards 

The Imagen Award is organized by the Imagen Foundation, an American organization dedicated to "recognize and reward positive portrayals of Latinos in all forms of media". Plaza was nominated four times.

NAACP Image Awards 

The NAACP Image Award, presented annually by the American National Association for the Advancement of Colored People, was established 1967 in order to honor people of color for their work in film, television, music, and literature. The series has two wins out of six nominations, both won by Ken Whittingham for directing.

Peabody Awards 

The Peabody Award recognizes excellence in various platforms of the media, including film, television, and radio. The award "spotlight[s] instances of how electronic media can teach, expand our horizons, defend the public interest, or encourage empathy with others". Parks and Recreation was honored in 2012. The award association gave the following description of the show:

Producers Guild of America Awards 

The Producers Guild of America Award is bestowed by the Producers Guild of America to honor the work of producers in film and television. Parks and Recreation has one nomination.

Satellite Awards 

The Satellite Award is given annually by the International Press Academy (IPA) to honor the best work in the entertainment industry. Poehler received three nominations while Parks and Recreation was nominated once as a series.

Screen Actors Guild Awards 

The Screen Actors Guild Award, given by the Screen Actors Guild‐American Federation of Television and Radio Artists (SAG-AFTRA), is an award dedicated to honor the best performances of actors in film and television. Poehler received three nominations.

Writers Guild of America Awards 

First presented in 1949, the Writers Guild of America Award recognizes the work of film, television and radio screenwriters. Parks and Recreation was nominated five times between 2012 and 2014, including three times for the best series and twice for an individual episode.

Notes

References

External links 
 Awards for Parks and Recreation at the Internet Movie Database

Parks and Recreation
Parks and Recreation